Virbia cyana is a moth in the family Erebidae. It was described by Paul Dognin in 1909. It is found in Colombia.

References

Natural History Museum Lepidoptera generic names catalog

Moths described in 1909
cyana